Prevail I is the fourth studio album from Canadian heavy metal band Kobra and the Lotus.  Funded via crowdfunding site PledgeMusic, the work was released on 12 May 2017, with Prevail II, the second part of the double album scheduled to be released shortly thereafter.  On 9 November 2016, the ensemble released "TriggerPulse", the first single from the album. On 17 February 2017, the ensemble released "Gotham", the second single from the album.

Track listing

Credit

Personnel 
Kobra Paige - lead vocals
Jasio Kulakowski - lead/rhythm guitars, engineering
Brad Kennedy - bass
Marcus Lee - drums

Additional personnel 
Dino Tomic - artwork
Jacob Hensen - producer, engineering, mixing, mastering
Jonas Hensen - engineering, recording
Tim Tronckoe - photography

References 

2017 albums
Kobra and the Lotus albums
Napalm Records albums